Nadia Badawi AM  is a medical researcher and an expert on newborn encephalopathy and cerebral palsy. She is the Chair of Cerebral Palsy at the University of Sydney.

Life 
Badawi grew up in Egypt and trained in paediatrics and neonatology there. She later moved to Dublin, Ireland, and arrived in Australia in 1992 to work with Fiona Stanley at the Telethon Institute for Child Health Research in Perth. Enrolling at the University of Western Australia, and with Stanley as her supervisor, Badawi worked on a research project for her Ph.D, completing it in 1998. The research, into newborn encephalopathy, remains unique in the world. A publication by the American College of Obstetricians and Gynaecologists and the American Academy of Pediatrics described her work as the "best available evidence" on neonatal encephalopathy.

In 1997, Badawi moved to Sydney and took up the position of head of the Grace Centre for Newborn Care at the Royal Alexandra Hospital for Children.

In 2009, Cerebral Palsy Alliance appointed Badawi as Australia's first Chair of Cerebral Palsy, at the University of Notre Dame Australia, to supervise projects funded by the Research Foundation of Cerebral Palsy Alliance. In 2015 the position moved to the Sydney Medical School at the University of Sydney.

In 2015, Badawi co-established the International Cerebral Palsy Research Foundation in the USA. She is a significant contributor to the Australian Cerebral Palsy Register Group, a national register held by the Cerebral Palsy Alliance Research Institute.

Awards and honours 
In the 2014 Queen's Birthday Honours, Badawi was appointed to the Order of Australia for her service to paediatrics and neo-natal intensive care medicine as a clinician and researcher, and for her promotion of research into cerebral palsy.

References

Living people
Year of birth missing (living people)
Members of the Order of Australia
Australian medical researchers
Australian women medical doctors
Australian medical doctors
Egyptian emigrants to Australia
University of Western Australia alumni
Academic staff of the University of Sydney